Koki Arita (有田 光希, born 23 September 1991) is a Japanese football player.

Career statistics

Club
Updated to end of 2018 season.

References

External links
Profile at Ehime FC

1991 births
Living people
Association football people from Niigata Prefecture
Japanese footballers
J1 League players
J2 League players
Vissel Kobe players
Ehime FC players
Kyoto Sanga FC players
Association football forwards